Austroicetes frater, commonly known as the southern austroicetes, is an Australian grasshopper in the subfamily Oedipodinae and genus Austroicetes.

It is found in regions of Western Australia, South Australia, Victoria, Tasmania, Yorktown and New South Wales. Information regarding the species has been published in Jahresheft des Naturwissenschaftlichen Vereines des Trencsiner Comitates (Jahresh. Naturwiss. Ver. Trencsiner Comit. ) 19-20 by Karel Brancsik in 1897. There are no subspecies listed in the Catalogue of Life.

Description 
The southern austroicetes has a slim, tan body and burnt umber eyes. It has wings, but mainly jumps with its back legs. A shield, called pronotum, is located at the front segment of the thorax. The last section of the leg has four segments and the antennae has more than seven segments. The joint between leg and foot (tarsi) has 11 segments, with spiracles on the first eight. A. frater is abundant from mid August to early December. Their diet consists of a diversity of food, although they prefer green plants. There has been continuous usage of ULV insecticides and bran baits on the grasshopper.

Life cycle 
Adults lay eggs in the ground around June or July. The eggs begin to mature, then go to sleep until they are awoken by the cool weather of winter. The eggs rapidly mature as temperature increases in spring, and hatch the following August when abundant food is available. Nymphs shed many times, and become adults who lay eggs between October and November. One generation is produced annually.

Etymology 
The prefix austro- in Austroicetes is used in compound words, meaning "south". It was derived from the Latin word . The word , is the Latin word meaning "brother".

See also 

Austroicetes vulgaris
Family Romaleidae

References

External links 

Oedipodinae
Insects described in 1898